San Vicente de la Cabeza is a municipality located in the province of Zamora, Castile and León, Spain. According to the 2004 census (INE), the municipality has a population of 559 inhabitants.

Town hall
San Vicente de la Cabeza is home to the town hall of 4 villages:
Bercianos de Aliste (125 inhabitants, INE 2020).
San Vicente de la Cabeza (106 inhabitants, INE 2020).
Palazuelo de las Cuevas (104 inhabitants, INE 2020).
Campogrande de Aliste (22 inhabitants, INE 2020).

References

Municipalities of the Province of Zamora